Harihar Banerjee (15 April 1922 - 28 March 1999) was an Indian sports shooter. He competed at the 1952 Summer Olympics and 1956 Summer Olympics.

References

External links
 

1922 births
1999 deaths
Sportspeople from Kolkata
Indian male sport shooters
Olympic shooters of India
Shooters at the 1952 Summer Olympics
Shooters at the 1956 Summer Olympics
Place of birth missing